Priscilla Bonner (February 17, 1899 – February 21, 1996) was an American silent film actress who specialized in portraying virginal, innocent heroines.

Early years 

Priscilla Bonner was born in Washington, D.C. on February 17, 1899. Her father, John S. Bonner, worked for Page Fence and served as an officer in Company B of the local National Guard Unit.  At the start of World War I  the company was activated for service, and her father started his career as an Army officer. The family moved often, and she spent much of her life in different places. 
She often play acted to amuse herself, playing all the parts and shifting the sets.  While her father was stationed in Chicago, assigned to the staff of General Leonard Wood, she received a call from someone connected with Chicago Photoplay, insisting she come to their studio for photographs. Although realizing it was likely a wrong number, Bonner went. Intrigued by her bold initiative and photogenic charisma, the studio took portraits of her and sent them to film studios in California. Her parents allowed to travel to Los Angeles.

Career
In 1916 when living in Adrian, Michigan, Bonner answered an open call to audition for the movie The Romance of Miss Adrian. Using her dance skills she won a part in the picture.

In Los Angeles, she met Charles Ray, and appeared in the 1920 film Homer Comes Home, after being signed by MGM that year. She went on to co-star with Jack Pickford in The Man Who Had Everything (1920), Lon Chaney, Sr. in Shadows (1922), Colleen Moore in April Showers, and comedian Harry Langdon in The Strong Man. In 1925 she successfully sued Warner Bros. and won a substantial cash settlement when she was originally chosen and then dropped as leading lady from John Barrymore's The Sea Beast in favor of Barrymore's new real life love interest Dolores Costello.

That same year she starred in the controversial independent film The Red Kimono produced and directed by Dorothy Davenport, the widow of Wallace Reid. In 1927, Bonner was loaned to Paramount Pictures to co-star in the box office hit It, starring Clara Bow.

Personal life
In 1921, she married writer and author Allen Wynes Alexander. A little over a year later, he left her. She sued for divorce, but later dismissed the case.

In 1928, Bonner married Dr. E. Bertrand Woolfan. She retired from films the following year. The couple were popular hosts to the burgeoning Los Angeles literary and film community, and particularly befriended Preston Sturges, the writer and director. On February 21, 1996, Bonner died at the age of 97.

Her younger sister was actress and writer Margerie Bonner.

Filmography

References
Notes

Bibliography

External links

 
 
 
 

Actresses from Washington, D.C.
American film actresses
American silent film actresses
Burials at Forest Lawn Memorial Park (Hollywood Hills)
1899 births
1996 deaths
20th-century American actresses